The National Health and Medical Research Council (NHMRC) is the main statutory authority of the Australian Government responsible for medical research. It was the eighth largest research funding body in the world in 2016, and NHMRC-funded research is globally recognised for its high quality. Around 45% of all Australian medical research from 200812 was funded by the federal government, through the NHMRC.

As an independent arm of the Department of Health, the NHMRC funds high quality health and medical research, builds research capability in Australia, support the translation of health and medical research into better health outcomes, and promote the ethics and integrity in research. Non-health research is funded by the Australian Research Council.

Activities 
The National Health and Medical Research Council Act 1992 provides for NHMRC to pursue activities designed to:

 raise the standard of individual and public health throughout Australia
 foster the development of consistent health standards between the various States and Territories
 foster medical research and training and public health research and training throughout Australia
 foster consideration of ethical issues relating to health.

As stated in its 2019-20 Corporate Plan, these activities take place within three thematic areas: investment, translation and integrity.

Investment 
NHMRC invests in health and medical research through its grant program. Funding received for health and medical research from the Australian Government and other sources through the Medical Research Endowment Account (MREA) amounted to $882.7 million in 2018–19. This amount was exclusive of NHMRC's administrative costs, which are funded separately to the MREA.

To be eligible to apply, grant applicants are required to work through an NHMRC Administering Institution. With the exception of Targeted Calls for Research and priority areas, NHMRC does not direct funding to any specific disease or health issue. Research topics are investigator driven and funding decisions are the outcome of a competitive process that relies on the collective judgement of independent peer reviewers, guided by NHMRC's Principles of peer review.

NHMRC's grant program consists of four funding streams:

 Investigator Grants, which provide the highest-performing researchers at all career stages with funding for their salary (if required) and a significant research support package.
 Synergy Grants, which provide funding for outstanding multi-disciplinary research teams to work together to answer complex questions.
 Ideas Grants, which support researchers at all career stages to pursue innovative and creative research projects.
 Strategic and Leveraging Grants, which support research that addresses identified national needs. These grant schemes include:
 Targeted and Urgent Calls for Research
 Clinical Trials and Cohort Studies
 Centres of Research Excellence
 Development Grants
 international collaborative schemes
 Partnerships for Better Health (Partnership Centres and Partnership Projects).

NHMRC also funds successful applicants to attain a research-based postgraduate degree through its Postgraduate Scholarships scheme.

The funds invested by NHMRC are drawn from its Medical Research Endowment Account and from separate accounts established to hold philanthropic gifts and bequests.

Translation 
One of NHMRC's primary responsibilities is supporting the effective and rapid translation of research findings into health policy and practice. Specific activities undertaken by NHMRC to support research translation include:

 The development, and support for the development, of Guidelines for clinical practice, public health, environmental health and ethics.
 The Advanced Health Research and Translation Centres (AHRTCs) and Centres for Innovation in Regional Health (CIRH) which bring together researchers, healthcare providers, education and training to improve the health and well-being of patients and the populations they serve.
 The NHMRC Research Translation Symposium, which provides attendees with an opportunity to learn and share information about research translation.
 Funding schemes, including Partnership Projects, Partnership Centres, Centres of Research Excellence, and Clinical Trials and Cohort Studies Grants.
 NHMRC supports national access to the Cochrane Library for all Australian residents. Cochrane promote evidence-informed health decision-making by translating research evidence into high-quality, relevant, accessible systematic reviews and other synthesised research evidence.

Integrity 
NHMRC promotes research quality, ethics and integrity through a range of activities, including:  

 NHMRC's Research Quality Strategy, which aims to ensure the highest quality of NHMRC-funded research through the provision of guidance and support for good research practices throughout the research cycle.
 The Australian Code for the Responsible Conduct of Research, 2018 and its associated guides, which are co-authored by NHMRC, the Australian Research Council and Universities Australia, and present clear principles, responsibilities and processes to encourage the responsible conduct of research.
 The National Statement on Ethical Conduct in Human Research, which informs the design, ethical review and conduct of human research.
 The Australian code for the care and use of animals for scientific purposes, 2013, which provides guidance for investigators, institutions, animal ethics committees, animal carers and all those involved in the care and use of animals for scientific purposes.
 Administration of the Human Research Ethics Application form website and the National Certification Scheme for the ethics review of multi-centre research, which facilitate timely and efficient ethics review for research involving humans.
 Jointly administering the Australian Research Integrity Committee with the Australian Research Council to undertake reviews of institutional processes used to manage and investigate potential breaches of the Australian Code for the Responsible Conduct of Research, 2018.
 Reviewing and enhancing relevant guidelines and the licensing process relating to the Prohibition of Human Cloning for Reproduction Act 2002 and the Research Involving Human Embryos Act 2002.
 Supporting the work of committees including the Australian Research Integrity Committee, the Australian Health Ethics Committee and the Embryo Research Licensing Committee.

Impact 
NHMRC's activities lead to impacts on knowledge, health, the economy and society. Information about these impacts is available from:

 Research Excellence Awards
 NHMRC Analysis of Australian Health and Medical Research Publications
 NHMRC Research Translation Symposium
 Impact Case Studies
 Corporate plans and Annual Reports

Organisation and leadership 
NHMRC is, formally, a council consisting of the Commonwealth, state and territory chief medical officers, as well as persons with expertise in a variety of areas including:

 public health
 public health research and medical research issues
 ethics relating to research involving humans and animals
 the health needs of Aboriginal persons and Torres Strait Islanders
 consumer issues (such as on community involvement in clinical trials)
 business
 health care training
 professional medical standards
 the medical profession and post‑graduate medical training
 the nursing profession.

This Council advises the chief executive officer (CEO) and is supported by the Office of NHMRC.

Committees 
Section 35 of the NHMRC Act 1992 allows the Minister for Health to establish Principal Committees to assist the council to carry out any of its functions. Two such committees are required by the Act:

 a Research Committee to advise and make recommendations to the council on the application of the Medical Research Endowment Account, and on matters relating to medical research and public health research
 the Australian Health Ethics Committee to advise the council on ethical issues relating to health and to develop and give the Council human research guidelines.

Section 39 of the Act enables the CEO to establish working committees to help carry out the functions of the CEO, the council or a Principal Committee. Peer Review Panels are the most common type of working committee established by the CEO.

History 
In May 1923, the Australian Government called a Premiers' Conference "to devise measures for the co-operation of the Commonwealth and the States and of States with States and to provide uniformity of legislation and administration on health matters". By agreement at the Conference, a Royal Commission on health was appointed in 1925.

The report of the commission (the Hone Report) recommended the constitution of a Federal Health Council as an advisory body which should meet at least annually for the purpose of reviewing co-operation between Commonwealth and State health authorities.

The Report also recommended that the Commonwealth should provide a fund in aid of research on health questions, and establish a Council to administer it.

In response to these recommendations, a Federal Health Council was established by the Governor-General (by Order-in-Council) in 1926. The secretariat to the council was provided by the Australian Government Department of Health, which was itself established in 1921.

The first meeting of the council was held on the 25 January 1927.

At its ninth session, in April 1936, the Council proposed a revision of its functions, and the Commonwealth responded to this recommendation, together with the previous proposals on research made by the Royal Commission on Health. In September 1936, a revised Order-in-Council created a National Health and Medical Research Council to replace the Federal Health Council.

In addition to its previous role advising the Commonwealth and states (but not territories, as these did not exist at that time) on public health questions, NHMRC was also able to provide advice on medical research, including advice to the Commonwealth on the expenditure of money on medical research. To support this latter activity, the Medical Research Endowment Act 1937 was passed. This Act established the Medical Research Endowment Fund to support medical research.

The National Health and Medical Research Council Act 1992 (NHMRC Act 1992), which came into effect on 24 June 1993, provided a legislative basis for NHMRC.

Reviews 
In 1998, the Health and Medical Research Strategic Review committee, chaired by Mr Peter Wills AC, presented a report to the Australian Government (The Virtuous Cycle) which led to a significant increase in funding for the health and medical research sector through NHMRC.

Between 2000 and 2018, the number of NHMRC-funded grants – across all research grant schemes – increased from 1870 to 4241 active grants, and total expenditure from NHMRC's Medical Research Endowment Account increased from $170 million to $861 million: a fivefold increase in funding.

Following amendments to the NHMRC Act 1992, NHMRC became an independent statutory agency within the Health and Ageing portfolio on 1 July 2006.

The Strategic Review of Health and Medical Research in Australia (McKeon Review) was established by the Australian Government in late 2011, and the report of the Review was publicly released in April 2013. The Review recommended a 10-year strategic health and medical research plan for the nation and included recommendations relating to NHMRC.

Medical Research Future Fund (MRFF) 
As part of the 2014–15 Budget the Government announced the establishment of the $20 billion Medical Research Future Fund (MRFF). The MRFF provides funding to address medical research priorities, drive innovation, improve delivery of health care, boost the effectiveness of the health system, and contribute to economic growth. It therefore complements and enhances funding for health and medical research provided by NHMRC.

NHMRC is assisting the Department of Health to implement disbursements from the MRFF. This assistance draws on NHMRC's application and assessment processes and the expertise available to NHMRC through the health and medical research sector and other sources.

New grant program 
NHMRC's new grant program commenced in December 2018, with the opening of the Investigator Grant scheme. The development and implementation of the new grant program involved extensive stakeholder consultation on its objectives and peer review processes.

Timeline

Governance

Chief executive officers 
The CEO is the accountable authority of NHMRC. The role of CEO was established in 2000 through a change to the NHMRC Act 1992.

Chairs 
The functions of the council, led by the chair, are to provide advice to the CEO in relation to the performance of his or her functions.

Secretaries 
Prior to the establishment of the role of CEO, a number of the CEO's functions were performed by the Secretary of the council.

See also 

 National Institutes of Health (NIH)
 Canadian Institutes of Health Research (CIHR)
 Medical Research Council (MRC)
 Australian Research Council (ARC)

Notes

References

External links 

Commonwealth Government agencies of Australia
Funding bodies of Australia
Health care quality
Research in Australia
 *
1936 establishments in Australia